Libya competed at the 2022 Mediterranean Games held in Oran, Algeria from 25 June to 6 July 2022.

Medalists

Archery

Libya competed in archery.

Athletics

Libya competed in athletics.

Boxing

Libya competed in boxing.

Boules

Libya won one bronze medal in boules.

Cycling

Libya competed in cycling.

Equestrian

Libya competed in equestrian.

Fencing

Libya competed in fencing.

Judo

Libya competed in judo.

Karate

Libya competed in karate.

Men

Sailing

Libya competed in sailing.

Shooting

Libya competed in shooting.

Swimming

Libya competed in swimming.

Men

Table tennis

Libya competed in table tennis.

Taekwondo

Libya competed in Taekwondo.

 Legend
 PTG — Won by Points Gap
 SUP — Won by superiority
 OT — Won on over time (Golden Point)
 DQ — Won by disqualification
 PUN — Won by punitive declaration
 WD — Won by withdrawal

Men

Weightlifting

Libya competed in weightlifting.

Men

References

Nations at the 2022 Mediterranean Games
2022
Mediterranean Games